Julia Usher (born 1945) is an English musician, project animateur and composer, and is known for musical theater. Besides composing, she also works as a music therapist.

Biography
Julia Usher began music studies at York University and Cambridge, and studied under Robert Sherlaw Johnson. She graduated with a Master of Arts degree and afterward lived and worked in London.

In 1980 Usher set up the composer-publishing firm Primavera with Welsh composer Enid Luff. Usher was a founding member of Women in Music in 1987, and she has worked with ensembles including Sounds Positive, the New London Wind Ensemble, the Nash Ensemble, E2K, Ivor Bolton and Inter Artes. In the 1980s, Usher collaborated in a series of cross-arts projects with the sound sculptor and painter Derek Shiel.

In 1999 Usher moved to Colchester and since 2001 has concentrated on developing works within community arts projects in North Essex. Usher has worked as Composer in Residence with the Colchester Youth Chamber Orchestra. As part of the Lullaby Project in Colchester she recorded, transcribed, and translated songs (with the help of the contributors) to provide English versions of traditional folk songs from different cultures. Her compositions have won awards including the Wangford Festival Prize and a British Clavichord Society prize. Recordings of her work have been issued on CD/DVD, and she has conducted music therapy sessions for Nordoff-Robbins.

Works
A review in the London Evening Standard described Usher's contribution to the Shiel/Usher collaboration:

"The second breakthrough came when a composer, Julia Usher, discovered she could notate the timbre and pitch of these strange objects and so compose music for them. This led to a series of collaborations, notably A Celebration of Blake's Vision at St James's Church, Piccadilly, in 1987, and Soundpaint performances where Usher plays while Shiel paints; he recently splashed out in colour for eight hours in front of a live audience."

Selected works by Julia Usher include:

1980 A Reed in the Wind (Solo Oboe) Wangford Festival Prize 
1986 The Orford Merman (Music Theatre)
1989 Marak (Piano Solo) 4 short abstract pieces
1993 Sacred Conversations (mixed ensemble) 
1996 Genetic Code, orchestral piece 
2001 Before Light Ends (Piano Solo) 
2002 Lost Icons Wind quintet
2002 Magnificat, commissioned by Women in Music for the Millennium
2004 Clavicle (Clavichord) Prize from British Clavichord Society 
2005 Periodic Table lll for cl, ob, va, pf
2005 Unruly Sun ( vn, vcl, harpsichord) commissioned by Semley Festival, Dorset
2007 Malkin, Theatre Piece (chamber ensemble)
 
Other:
Unfinished Business
Constellations (1980) flute solo suite
SoundPaint (1995–98) live improvisation performance piece
Vocalism 
When I Saw the Learned Astronomer
Moths and Moonlight
The Lullaby Project
A World of Song

Discography
Sacred Physic: Music by Julia Usher (2004) - Audio CD by Julia Usher, Janet Simpson, Peter Lawson, and Lesley-Jane Rogers
Touching the Wall: Performance with synchronised graphic imagery of Usher's Clavicle by Andrea Gregori, DVD, 2007.
Selected Oboe Exam Recordings (2006) ABRSM

References

1945 births
Living people
20th-century classical composers
English classical composers
Women classical composers
20th-century English composers
20th-century English women musicians
20th-century women composers